Pantano is an Italian surname. Notable people with the surname include:

Daniele Pantano (born 1976), Swiss poet
Giancarlo Pantano (born 1977), Italian footballer
Giorgio Pantano (born 1979), Italian racing driver
Ilario Pantano (born 1971), United States Marine Corps officer
Jarlinson Pantano (born 1988), Colombian cyclist
Paul Pantano (born 1982), Australian actor
Stefano Pantano (born 1962), Italian fencer
Tony Pantano (died 2023), Italian-born Australian musician

Italian-language surnames